CCGS Ann Harvey is a Canadian Coast Guard buoy tender and SAR vessel with light icebreaker duties. She was constructed in 1987 by Halifax Dartmouth Industries, in Halifax, Nova Scotia. The vessel was named after Ann Harvey, the daughter of a local Newfoundland fisherman who helped rescue 185 people during her lifetime. Ann Harveys home port is St. John's, Newfoundland and Labrador and is stationed there with other Coast Guard ships.

Design and description

Ann Harvey is propelled by two fixed-pitch propellers and bow thrusters powered by three Alco 251-16V diesel-electric engines creating  and three Canadian GE generators producing 6 megawatts of AC power driving two Canadian GE motors creating . The ship is also equipped with one Caterpillar 3306 emergency generator. The ship is certified as Arctic Class 2.

The vessel is equipped with one Racal Decca Bridgemaster navigational radar operating on the I band. Ann Harvey has a speed crane derrick capable of lifting  and two sea cranes capable of lifting . The ship carries a  rescue craft and a self-propelled barge. Ann Harvey is equipped with a flight deck and a hangar that originally housed light helicopters of the MBB Bo 105 or Bell 206L types, but in the 2010s, the Bell 429 GlobalRanger and Bell 412EPI were acquired by the Canadian Coast Guard to replace the older helicopters. However, the vessel is only allotted one helicopter. The ship has a complement of 26, with 10 officers and 16 crew. Ann Harvey has 23 additional berths.

Service history
Constructed by Halifax Dartmouth Industries at their yard in Halifax, Nova Scotia with the yard number 72, Ann Harvey was launched on 12 December 1985. The vessel entered service with the Canadian Coast Guard on 29 June 1987, registered in Ottawa, Ontario. The vessel is assigned to the Newfoundland Region, homeported at St. John's, Newfoundland and Labrador.

The ship had been performing work on buoys when it hit bottom. A hole was torn in the hull and as she pulled back off the rocks, water flooded the motor propulsion room. The ship had lost power when the motor propulsion room and the space aft of it were flooded.

The lifeboat CCGS W.G. George was the first ship to arrive on scene. W.G. George towed Ann Harvey to the west. At 1:30 a.m. Louis S. St-Laurent arrived and took over. Once temporary repairs were completed, the ship was towed to St. John's where permanent hull repairs were completed at NewDock St. John's Dockyard LTD.

While undergoing repairs in St. John's, it was decided by the Canadian Coast Guard to begin the ship's Vessel Life Extension refit. The electric propulsion  motors were removed and sent to Burlington, Ontario for overhaul. The crew lounge, engineer offices and helicopter track were cut out of the ship in order to remove the motors. The refit should last until mid-2017.

References

Notes

Citations

Sources

External links

Ships built in Nova Scotia
1987 ships
Martha L. Black-class icebreakers